Dongmen (zhuang: Dunghmonz Cin) is a town under the administration of Fusui County in southern Guangxi Zhuang Autonomous Region, China. , it had an area of  populated by 44,000 people residing in 1 residential communities and 15 villages.

Administrative divisions
There are 1 residential communities and 15 villages:

Residential communities:
 Dongmen(东门社区)

Villages:
 Banbao(板包村), Baidang(佰党村),  Haozuo(郝佐村), Liutou(六头村), Balou(岜楼村), Qurong ( 渠荣村), Bulian( 布练村), Jiucheng(旧城村), Zìyao(自尧村), Buge(卜葛村), Najiang(那江村),  Naba(那巴村), Jiangbian( 江边村), Lingnan( 岭南村), Tuoda( 驮达村)

See also

List of township-level divisions of Guangxi

References

External links
  Dongmen Town/Official website of Dongmen

Towns of Guangxi
Fusui County